Yevhen Pyeskov (born 22 September 1981 in Zaporizhzhia, Ukraine) is a professional Ukrainian association football midfielder.

Career
He played for Vorskla Poltava in the Ukrainian Premier League. He joined Vorskla Poltava from PFC Sevastopol
in December 2006.

External links 

 Profile on Football Squads

1981 births
Living people
Footballers from Zaporizhzhia
Ukrainian footballers
FC Uholyok Myrnohrad players
FC Krystal Kherson players
FC Sevastopol players
FC Vorskla Poltava players
Ukrainian Premier League players
Ukrainian First League players
Ukrainian Second League players
Association football midfielders